Omar Abdulaziz Al-Zahrani is a Saudi Arabian dissident video blogger and activist living in exile in Montreal, Canada. He was close friends and worked with Jamal Khashoggi, as recounted in the film The Dissident (2020). He is a member of the National Assembly Party.

Biography
He hosts a YouTube satire program known for its criticism of the kingdom and its leadership. Consulting firm McKinsey & Company named Abdulaziz in an internal report as one of the top Saudi influencers on Twitter.

He applied for asylum in 2014, when his student scholarship was cancelled after he criticised the Saudi government. He became a Canadian permanent resident in 2017.

Abdulaziz was close friends and worked with Jamal Khashoggi—the Saudi dissident and journalist for The Washington Post—on various initiatives after Khashoggi left the kingdom to live in exile in 2017. In 2018 Abdulaziz's phone was hacked and his conversations with Khashoggi were intercepted. Khashoggi was later assassinated by Saudi Arabia. Abdulaziz's two brothers and several friends are imprisoned in their homes in Saudi Arabia because of their links to him.

His story features prominently in the film The Dissident (2020), directed by Bryan Fogel.

References

External links

Saudi Arabian dissidents
Saudi Arabian emigrants to Canada
People from Jeddah
Living people
Saudi Arabian YouTubers
Saudi Arabian activists
1991 births